IGC Centre is a lava dome in Mount Edziza Provincial Park of northern British Columbia, Canada. It is thought to have formed and last erupted during the Miocene period.

See also
List of volcanoes in Canada
List of Northern Cordilleran volcanoes
Mount Edziza volcanic complex
Volcanism of Canada
Volcanism of Western Canada

References

Volcanoes of British Columbia
Mountains of British Columbia
Miocene lava domes